Polygenesis can refer to:

 Polygenesis (linguistics), a theory of language origin
 Polygenism, a theory of human origin
 Gene duplication, a form of genetic disorder resulting in the overexpression of a particular gene Gourav
 Polygenetic landforms, landforms formed the accumulative action of various processes